The 2016–17 Ohio State Buckeyes men's basketball team represented Ohio State University in the 2016–17 NCAA Division I men's basketball season. Their head coach is Thad Matta, in his 13th season with the Buckeyes. The Buckeyes played their home games at Value City Arena in Columbus, Ohio and were members of the Big Ten Conference. They finished the season 17–15, 7–11 in Big Ten play to finish in a tie for 10th place. As the No. 11 seed in the Big Ten tournament, they lost in the first round to Rutgers.

On June 5, 2017, the school announced that head coach Thad Matta would not return as head coach. On June 9, the school hired Butler head coach Chris Holtmann as head coach.

Previous season
The Buckeyes finished the 2015–16 season with a record of 21–14, 11–7 in Big Ten play to finish in seventh place. They defeated Penn State in the second round of the Big Ten tournament to advance to the quarterfinals where they lost to Michigan State. They received an invitation to the National Invitational tournament where they defeated Akron in the first round to before losing to Florida.

Departures

Incoming transfers

Recruiting Class of 2016

Recruiting Class of 2017

Recruiting Class of 2018

Roster

Schedule

|-
!colspan=9 style=| Exhibition

|-
!colspan=9 style=| Non-conference regular season

|-
!colspan=9 style=|Big Ten regular season

|-
!colspan=9 style=| Big Ten tournament

Source:

See also
 2016–17 Ohio State Buckeyes women's basketball team

References

Ohio State Buckeyes men's basketball seasons
Ohio State
Ohio State Buckeyes
Ohio State Buckeyes